The 2020–21 season was the 33rd season of Churchill Brothers S.C. in existence and Twelfth season in the I-League.

Team

First team squad

Technical staff

Competitions

I-League

League table

League Results by round

League Matchdays

Championship Stage (Group A)

References

Churchill Brothers FC Goa seasons
Churchill Brothers